Maryland v. Craig, 497 U.S. 836 (1990), was a U.S. Supreme Court case involving the Sixth Amendment. The Court ruled that the Sixth Amendment's Confrontation Clause, which provides criminal defendants with the right to confront witnesses against them, did not bar the use of one-way closed-circuit television to present testimony by an alleged child sex abuse victim.

Background
Defendant Sandra A. Craig was charged with sexually abusing a minor child. At trial, the child was reportedly unable to testify in the physical presence of the defendant due to severe emotional trauma. The trial court set her up in a separate room with the judge, the prosecutor, and the defense attorney, so that the defendant and jury could only see her testify via the live television screen in the courtroom, and she could not see them. Craig was convicted, but the Maryland Court of Appeals reversed, ruling that her Sixth Amendment rights were violated by the use of the transmitted testimony, because the Confrontation Clause guaranteed face-to-face confrontation. The state of Maryland sought certiorari to the U.S. Supreme Court, which granted the petition.

Opinion of the Court
In a 5–4 decision, the Supreme Court reversed the Maryland high court, reinstating the conviction. Justice O'Connor wrote for the majority, ruling that the Confrontation Clause merely embodies a "preference" for face-to-face, in person confrontation, which may be limited to satisfy sufficiently important interests. Because the child witness was cross-examined by the defendant's attorney and her general demeanor was visible in the courtroom, the defendant had a constitutionally sufficient opportunity to test her credibility and the substance of her testimony before the jury. 

Craig came shortly after the Court had invalidated the use of a screen to hide a similarly situated child witness/victim in Coy v. Iowa (1988). The Court in Coy had found "no individualized findings (that the victims) needed special protection." Indeed, "face-to-face presence may, unfortunately, upset the truthful rape victim or abused child; but by the same token it may confound and undo the false accuser, or reveal the child coached by a malevolent adult." In contrast, the Maryland statute in Craig provided for an exception when a child's testimony would result in "serious emotional distress."  Furthermore, the use of one-way closed-circuit TV did not considerably obstruct the jury's observation of the child's testimony.

Justice O'Connor noted that the fundamental purpose of the Sixth Amendment was to prevent ex parte affidavits, citing Mattox v. United States 156 U.S. 237, 242 (1895). She further identified four primary guarantees embodied in the Confrontation Clause:
The right of "personal examination"
That a witness will testify under oath
That a witness will submit to cross-examination
That the jury may observe the demeanor of the witness in making his statement

The Court noted that hearsay exceptions demonstrated that no defendant had an absolute right to a face-to-face encounter with adversarial witnesses. While the Maryland exception did not provide face-to-face confrontation, the final three preserved guarantees were present. The State's interest in the physical and psychological well-being of child abuse victims could outweigh the defendant's right to face his accusers in court.

Dissent
Justice Scalia, in dissent, wrote that he was "persuaded...that the Maryland procedure is virtually constitutional. Since it is not, however, actually constitutional I would affirm the judgment of the Maryland Court of Appeals reversing the judgment of conviction."

Subsequent developments
The continued validity of Craig was called into question after the Supreme Court case Crawford v. Washington (2004). In Crawford, the Court overruled Ohio v. Roberts (1980), which Craig relied in large part upon. However, Craig remains good law. During the COVID-19 pandemic, federal courts conducting criminal trials, relied upon Craig to have witnesses testify by "Zoom or some other videoconferencing technology."

See also
 List of United States Supreme Court cases, volume 497
 List of United States Supreme Court cases
 Lists of United States Supreme Court cases by volume
 List of United States Supreme Court cases by the Rehnquist Court

References

External links

United States Supreme Court cases
United States Supreme Court cases of the Rehnquist Court
Confrontation Clause case law
1990 in United States case law
1990 in Maryland
Child sexual abuse in the United States